North Dakota Highway 38 (ND 38) is a  north–south state highway in the U.S. state of North Dakota. ND 38's southern terminus is at Interstate 94 (I 94)/US Highway 52 (US 52) south of Buffalo, and the northern terminus is at ND 32 west of Hope.

Major intersections

References

038
Transportation in Cass County, North Dakota
Transportation in Steele County, North Dakota